Oxelösund Municipality (Oxelösunds kommun) is a municipality in Södermanland County in southeast Sweden. Its seat is located in the city of Oxelösund.

In 1950 the Nikolai Rural municipality was dissolved. One part formed the then City of Oxelösund, one of the last newly created cities of Sweden. The rest of Nikolai was incorporated into the neighbouring City of Nyköping. In 1971 the city became a unitary municipality without addition of territory.

Still marked by its industrial past, the politics was historically dominated by the Social Democratic Party, and the industry by the harbour and iron works.

Geography
It covers a peninsula in the Baltic Sea, and borders by land only on Nyköping Municipality.

Elections since the 1972 municipal reform

Riksdag
No boundary changes. The Sweden Democrats' numbers were not listed by the SCB agency from 1988 to 1998 due to the party being out of contention for Riksdag entry.

Demographics
This is a demographic table based on Oxelösund Municipality's electoral districts in the 2022 Swedish general election sourced from SVT's election platform, in turn taken from SCB official statistics.

Residents include everyone registered as living in the district, regardless of age or citizenship status. Valid voters indicate Swedish citizens above the age of 18 who therefore can vote in general elections. Left vote and right vote indicate the result between the two major blocs in said district in the 2022 general election. Employment indicates the share of people between the ages of 20 and 64 who are working taxpayers. Foreign background denotes residents either born abroad or with two parents born outside of Sweden. Median income is the received monthly income through either employment, capital gains or social grants for the median adult above 20, also including pensioners in Swedish kronor. College graduates indicates any degree accumulated after high school.

There is a strong income disparity between the four districts on the southern shore and the other three downtown districts. In comparison, the wealthier districts would all be among the upper-half earners in the more affluent Nyköping Municipality, while the lower three would be right near the bottom. In total there were 12,125 inhabitants with 9,072 Swedish citizen adults eligible to vote. The political demographics were 52.5% for the left bloc and 45.4% for the right bloc.

International relations

Twin towns - Sister cities

Oxelösund is a member of the Douzelage, a unique town twinning association of 24 towns across the European Union. This active town twinning began in 1991 and there are regular events, such as a produce market from each of the other countries and festivals.  Discussions regarding membership are also in hand with three further towns (Agros in Cyprus, Škofja Loka in Slovenia, and Tryavna in Bulgaria).

References

External links

Oxelösund Municipality - Official site

Municipalities of Södermanland County